Sash! (stylised as SASH!) is a German DJ/production team, fronted by Sascha Lappessen (born 10 June 1970) who works in the recording studio with Ralf Kappmeier, Karl Xander, and Thomas "Alisson" Lüdke. They have sold over 22 million albums worldwide and earned more than 65 Gold and Platinum awards. In the UK, their first four hit singles incorporated vocals in different languages (French, Spanish, English and Italian).

Musical career

1995–1997: Formation and It's My Life – The Album

Sascha Lappessen, Thomas "Alisson" Lüdke, and Ralf Kappmeier founded SASH! in 1995. The previous year, the three had worked together, under the name of 'Careca', to produce a piece called "Indian Rave." In 1996, SASH! released "It's My Life", which became a European club hit. In 1997, with Sabine Ohmes as the singer, SASH! released "Encore une fois". It reached number 2 in the UK Singles Chart, as well as reaching the top 10 of five countries' singles charts and the top 20 of seven countries' singles charts.

In the same year, SASH! produced "Ecuador", and "Stay", which both also reached No. 2 in the UK Singles Chart.

1998–1999: Life Goes On

In 1998, SASH! released the first single from his second album, "La Primavera", which reached No. 3 in the UK, "Mysterious Times which became their fourth UK No.2", (No. 2), and "Move Mania", (No. 8). The following year, "Colour the World" peaked at No. 15 in the UK.

2000: Trilenium

In 1999, SASH! released "Adelante", the first single from album Trilenium. It peaked at No. 2 in the UK Singles Chart in January 2000, their fifth single to reach that position. Composer by Diter Bohlen.

2000: Encore Une Fois – The Greatest Hits

Encore Une Fois – The Greatest Hits is the group's fourth album and was released on 30 October 2000.

2002: S4! SASH!

In 2002, SASH! released the song "Ganbareh", which means "go for it". The song "Run" with Boy George was the next single release, with the new album released thereafter. The third single from the album S4!Sash! was "I Believe", which featured TJ Davis, and was released in 2003.

2007: 10th Anniversary

10th Anniversary is the sixth album by German DJ SASH!. It includes 16 singles, a reloaded version of Ecuador, previously unreleased songs, plus a bonus DVD including videoclips to all the songs from the album.

2008: The Best Of

After fifteen years, all singles were released on one album, The Best Of. A new song called "Raindrops" reached No. 9 in the UK chart.

Discography

Studio albums
 It's My Life (1997)
 Life Goes On (1998)
 Trilenium (2000)
 S4!Sash! (2002)
 Life Is A Beach (2012)
 Life Changes (2013)

References

External links
 Official website

1970 births
Living people
German electronic music groups
German trance music groups
German Eurodance groups
German DJs
German dance music groups
Dance Nations artists
Electronic dance music groups